Zhang Jiuhua (born 14 May 1969) is a former professional tennis player from China.

Biography
Zhang, who was born in Hubei, competed in the boys' doubles event at the 1985 US Open and reached the quarter-finals.

He won a silver medal for China in the singles at the 1990 Asian Games and was a singles bronze medalist at the 1993 Summer Universiade. 

His two ATP tour main draw appearances came at the 1994 Salem Open-Beijing and 1996 Shanghai Open, both times as a wildcard in the doubles events.

During his career he represented the China Davis Cup team in six ties, with all of his ten career matches coming in singles.

References

External links
 
 
 

1969 births
Living people
Chinese male tennis players
Tennis players from Hubei
Tennis players at the 1990 Asian Games
Medalists at the 1990 Asian Games
Asian Games silver medalists for China
Asian Games medalists in tennis
Universiade medalists in tennis
Universiade bronze medalists for China